Kosinov is a khutor in the urban okrug of Maykop, Russia. The population was 312 as of 2018. There are 2 streets.

Geography 
The khutor is located in the center of Adygea, 19 km north of Maykop (the district's administrative centre) by road. Podgorny is the nearest rural locality.

References 

Rural localities in Maykop Federal City